Garnet Edward Tanner (April 10, 1892 – November 4, 1955) was a physician and politician in Ontario, Canada. He represented Simcoe East in the Legislative Assembly of Ontario from 1934 to 1937 as a Liberal.

The son of Edward Charles Tanner and Hannah Hamil, he was born in Sarnia and was educated there and at Toronto University. In 1916, Tanner married Jessie Lee Finch. He served on the Water and Light Commission for Midland. Tanner was also president of the local Kiwanis club.

He died in Toronto General Hospital at the age of 63.

References

External links

1892 births
1955 deaths
Ontario Liberal Party MPPs
People from Sarnia